The 2008–09 Serbian League Belgrade was the fifth season of the league under its current title. It began in August 2008 and ended in June 2009.

League table

External links
 Football Association of Serbia
 Football Association of Belgrade

Serbian League Belgrade seasons
3
Serb